Craigmont is a dispersed rural community, unincorporated place, and ghost town in Carlow/Mayo, Hastings County in Central Ontario, Canada. It lies adjacent to the municipal boundary with Brudenell, Lyndoch and Raglan in Renfrew County. It was a former mining town that produced corundum from deposits in Mount Robillard, directly north of the community.

In 1876, the mountain was discovered as a source for corundum. In 1900, mining operations began by the Canada Corundum Company. A settlement, consisting of both a company town and a private town, grew to a peak population of 600 persons, making it the world's largest Corundum producer at that time. But in 1913, a fire destroyed the mill, resulting in job loss and a gradual decline. By 1921, Craigmont was a ghost town.

A small community remains along County Road 517 (the former Ontario Highway 517), with some of the original buildings and ruins on private property.

References

Other map sources:

External links
 Michal Adamowicz, "Craigmont Mine, the Mountain of Corundum in Ontario", photo essay (2008)
 Ghosttowns.com - Craigmont ghost town
 Ontario Abandoned Places - Craigmont

Communities in Hastings County
Communities in Renfrew County
Ghost towns in Ontario
Mining communities in Ontario